This is a list of state parks and natural areas in the U.S. state of Tennessee.

State parks
Tennessee has 56 designated state parks, operated by the Tennessee Department of Environment and Conservation (TDEC). The largest park, Justin P. Wilson Cumberland Trail, is made up of land along the Cumberland Trail, stretching from Cumberland Gap at the Virginia state line to Prentice Cooper State Forest in Marion County, just northwest of Chattanooga. The smallest state park is Bicentennial Capitol Mall, at just .

State natural areas
Tennessee has 85 state natural areas that are divided into two classes:
Class I – Scenic-Recreational
Class II – Natural-Scientific

Nine areas have restricted access and are not open to the public; a tenth, Hubbard's Cave, has limited access during the summer.

State scenic rivers
Tennessee state scenic rivers are divided into three classes:
Class I – Natural River Area – Free flowing, unpolluted, and with primitive shorelines and scenic vistas generally inaccessible except by trail.
Class II – Pastoral River Area – Free flowing, unpolluted, and with shorelines and scenic vistas partially or predominantly used for agricultural and other recreational activities.
Class III – Developed/Partially Developed River Area – Free flowing, unpolluted, and with shorelines and vistas more developed.

Former state parks and natural areas

State parks
 Poor Valley Creek State Park (cancelled)
 Ross Creek Landing

State natural areas
 Morril's Cave (Worley's Cave) State Natural Area, Sullivan County
 Short Mountain-Jim Cummings State Natural Area, Cannon County, 
 Sneed Road Cedar Glade State Natural Area, Williamson County,

See also
List of U.S. national parks

References

External links
Tennessee State Parks

 
Tennessee state parks
State parks